Yoon Suk-min (Hangul: 윤석민, Hanja: 尹錫珉; born July 24, 1986) is a South Korean former professional baseball pitcher. He bats and throws right-handed. He played for the Kia Tigers of the KBO League from 2005 to 2013, and 2015 to 2019, and also played one season with the Baltimore Orioles organization in 2014.

Yoon is a 6 ft 0 in, 190 lb right-handed pitcher. With a three-quarters delivery Yoon throws a fastball at 90-92 mph (tops out at 96 mph), a change-up, an occasional curveball, and a hard-breaking, mid-80s slider. With a shoulder injury his fastball dipped into high-80s, and he converted to relief during the 2013 season.

Professional career

Kia Tigers (2005–2013)
The Kia Tigers selected Yoon with the first pick in the second round of the  Korea Baseball Organization (KBO) draft. Yoon made his professional debut with the Tigers on April 2, 2005. In his rookie season, he showed signs of promise, with a 4.29 earned run average (ERA) in 84 innings pitched across 53 games as the Tigers' primary setup man. In , Yoon played as a middle reliever and closer for the Tigers, and collected nine holds and 19 saves.

In , Yoon joined the starting rotation due to the Tigers' ace Han Ki-joo's transition to a closing pitcher. Yoon had a 7-18 win–loss record with a 3.78 ERA as a starter. While his ERA was decent, he had poor run support in 18 of his losses, the most in the 2007 season. This gave him the nickname "The Unfortunate Ace". In , Yoon emerged as one of the most consistent pitchers in the KBO league, going 14–5 with a 2.33 ERA and 119 strikeouts in  innings pitched. He won the ERA title and finished runner-up to Kim Kwang-hyun in wins.

In August 2008, Yoon competed for the South Korean national baseball team in the 2008 Summer Olympics, where they won the gold medal in the baseball tournament. He was 2–0 with a save, a 2.34 ERA and six strikeouts, pitching  innings in five games as a utility pitcher. In March , Yoon competed for the South Korea national baseball team in the 2009 World Baseball Classic, where he went 2–0 with a 1.13 ERA and 13 strikeouts in 16 innings pitched, appearing in 4 games. He started against Venezuela in the semifinal game, and led South Korea to a 10–2 victory. Yoon baffled the South American major league all-star squad, allowing only two runs and seven hits in  innings pitched.

In the beginning of the 2009 KBO season, Yoon became the Tigers' closer again as Han Ki-joo was put on the disabled list. As a closer, he posted seven saves with a 2.45 ERA. Yoon returned to the starting rotation but was put on the disabled list for a month. In July, he returned from the injury and won all of his 7 decisions as a starter. However, he had the worst pitching performance in his pro career on September 5, allowing 10 runs in  innings against the Doosan Bears, and was then sidelined with a shoulder injury for the rest of the season. Yoon finished the season with a record of 9–4 with 7 saves, an ERA of 3.46 and 117 strikeouts in  innings pitched which didn't enable him to qualify for the ERA title.

Yoon was named Most Valuable Player (MVP) for the 2011 season. He received the KBO's highest honor for leading the league in four pitching categories, marking a 2.45 ERA, 17 wins, 178 strikeouts, and a .773 winning percentage in  innings. He is the first pitcher to stand at top of four categories since Korean pitching legend, Sun Dong-yeol accomplished the feat in 1991.

Baltimore Orioles (2014)
A free agent after the 2013 season, Yoon announced his intentions to play in Major League Baseball. Yoon reportedly agreed to a three-year contract, worth US$5.75 million, with the Baltimore Orioles. On February 17, 2014, Yoon passed his physicals and officially signed with the Orioles. Yoon pitched for the Norfolk Tides of the Class AAA International League, where he had a 4–8 record and a 5.74 ERA in 23 appearances. He was outrighted off the Orioles roster on August 30, 2014.

The Orioles opted not to invite Yoon to spring training in 2015. He chose to return to Korea rather than report to the Orioles' minor league camp. The Orioles released Yoon, with Yoon agreeing to forego the remainder of his contract.

Kia Tigers (2015–2018)
Yoon signed a four-year contract to return to the Tigers worth ₩9 billion (US$8.2 million), the largest contract signed by a free agent in KBO.

In 2015, his role was closer. He had a 2.96 ERA, 2–6 record, and 30 saves.

After Baseball
Yoon retired in 2019 after a shoulder injury derailed his career. He is currently attempting to become a professional golfer.

Achievements
2008 ERA Title
2008 WHIP Leader
2011 KBO MVP
2011 Golden glove

Notable international careers

References

External links
Career statistics and player information from Korea Baseball Organization

1986 births
Living people
South Korean baseball players
2009 World Baseball Classic players
2013 World Baseball Classic players
Baseball players at the 2008 Summer Olympics
Kia Tigers players
KBO League pitchers
Medalists at the 2008 Summer Olympics
Olympic baseball players of South Korea
Olympic gold medalists for South Korea
Olympic medalists in baseball
South Korean expatriates in the United States
Norfolk Tides players
Asian Games medalists in baseball
Baseball players at the 2006 Asian Games
Baseball players at the 2010 Asian Games
Asian Games gold medalists for South Korea
Asian Games bronze medalists for South Korea
Medalists at the 2006 Asian Games
Medalists at the 2010 Asian Games
South Korean Buddhists
People from Guri
Sportspeople from Gyeonggi Province